The Sony Zeiss Vario-Tessar T* E 16-70mm F4 ZA OSS is a constant maximum aperture zoom lens for the Sony E-mount, announced by Sony on August 27, 2013.

Build quality
The lens showcases a minimalist black metal exterior with a Zeiss badge on the side of the barrel and no zoom lock to prevent zoom creep. Both the zoom and focus rings are metal. The barrel of the lens telescopes outward from the main lens body as it's zoomed in from 16mm to 70mm.

Image quality
The lens has a tendency to be soft in the corners and toward the 70mm end of the lens' zoom range. However, the lens remains extremely sharp throughout the rest of the lens' zoom range with very minimal vignetting, distortion, and chromatic aberration.

See also
List of Sony E-mount lenses
Sony E 18-55mm F3.5-5.6 OSS
Sony E 18-105mm F4 G
Zeiss Vario-Tessar

References

Camera lenses introduced in 2013
16-70
16-70